Sâmburești is a commune in Olt County, Muntenia, Romania. It is composed of seven villages: Cerbeni, Ionicești, Lăunele, Mănulești, Sâmburești, Stănuleasa and Tonești.

References

Communes in Olt County
Localities in Muntenia